Brianna Butler (born February 13, 1994) is an American professional basketball player for the Perth Lynx in the Women's National Basketball League (WNBL).

College
Butler played college basketball at Syracuse University in Syracuse, New York for the Orange. During her time at Syracuse, Butler started in all 135 games played for the Orange. Holds the Syracuse record in three-pointers, with 373 made. She was also named to the All-ACC Second Team once and the All-ACC Academic Team twice.

Syracuse statistics

Source

Professional career

WNBA
In 2016, Butler became only the third player out of Syracuse to be taken in the WNBA draft, when she was picked by the Los Angeles Sparks. However, she was eventually cut from the roster.

Australia
Butler began her professional career in Israel, however, she was signed by the Perth Lynx to play in the Women's National Basketball League, Australia's premier women's league and the strongest league in the southern hemisphere. She was signed seven rounds in, as the Lynx's previous import, Monica Wright, has terminated her contract due to injury. There, Butler will play alongside two Olympians in Natalie Burton and Tessa Lavey.

References

1994 births
Living people
American expatriate basketball people in Australia
American expatriate basketball people in Israel
American women's basketball players
Guards (basketball)
Los Angeles Sparks draft picks
People from Upper Merion Township, Pennsylvania
Perth Lynx players
Syracuse Orange women's basketball players